Corvetto may refer to:
 Corvetto (fairy tale), Italian fairy tale by Giambattista Basile
 Corvetto (Milan Metro), Milan Metro stations

People
 Nicolás Corvetto (1986), Chilean footballer
 Louis-Emmanuel Corvetto (1756 - 1821) Genoese-French lawyer and politician